DZRJ (100.3 FM), broadcasting as 100.3 RJFM, is a radio station owned and operated by Rajah Broadcasting Network through its licensee Free Air Broadcasting Network, Inc. The station's studio is located at 7849 General Luna St. cor. Makati Ave., Makati, while its transmitter is located in Brgy. San Roque, Antipolo.

History
It was once known as DZUW-AM under the ownership of Republic Broadcasting System. Originally broadcasting on 1310 kHz AM, it moved to 100.3 MHz FM in 1973 on. In 1980, 100.3 FM was reformatted as 100.3 Wink FM and it changed its callsign to DWNK-FM. It was manned by all-female DJs.

Around 1986, during the Philippines' historic People Power Revolution, DZRJ-AM reformatted as Radyo Bandido with a news and talk format. Meanwhile, its album rock format transferred to the then-newly acquired 100.3 FM under the call letters DZRJ. As a result, it carried the brand RJFM: The Original Rock and Roll Radio.

On December 1995, it rebranded as Boss Radio and shifted to a classic rock format, focusing on the 50s, 60s and 70s. Among its on-air personalities were Eddie Mercado, Bong Lapira, Lito Gorospe, Larry Abando, Manny Caringal, Ronnie Quintos, Naldi Castro and Cito Paredes. By this time, it officially launched its nationwide satellite broadcasting, a first in the history of the company to achieve this milestone.

On June 1999, it rebranded as The Hive and switched to an alternative rock format.

On May 6, 2002, it rebranded as RJFM and switched to a variety hits format, airing music from the 60s to today, with its Sunday programming reserved for music from the 50s and 60s (Oldies). Initially fully automated, it was in May 2003 when it started having on-air jocks. RJFM has a daily morning program called "Beatles Anthology", featuring the songs of The Beatles for one whole hour.

See also
DZRJ 810 AM
RJ DigiTV 29

References

External links
 Official website

RJ 100.3
Oldies radio stations in the Philippines
Radio stations established in 1963
1963 establishments in the Philippines